Thom Allison is a Canadian actor. He is best known for his regular recurring role as Pree in the television series Killjoys, for which he won the Canadian Screen Award for Best Supporting Actor in a Drama Series at the 8th Canadian Screen Awards.

Biography 
Allison was born and raised in Winnipeg, Manitoba as the son of a Black Nova Scotian father and a Mennonite mother.

Education and career 
Allison graduated from the acting program offered at Ryerson Theatre School . Beginning his career in the early 1990s, Allison eventually went on to act for film, television and theatre alike.

Primarily a stage actor, he first attained prominence for his performance as Robin Turner in Canadian Stage's 2000 stage adaptation of Outrageous!, for which he received a Dora Mavor Moore Award nomination for Outstanding Performance by a Male in a Principal Role – Musical in 2001. He has also frequently appeared in productions at the Shaw Festival and the Stratford Festival, and in touring productions of Rent and Priscilla, Queen of the Desert, and appeared as drag queen Therese in the first episode of Kim's Convenience.

In 2003, Allison produced a solo CD A Whole Lotta Sunshine covering famous songs including "Moon River" and "Somewhere Over the Rainbow".

In 2019, Allison and Micah Barnes collaborated on Knishes 'n Grits, a stage show in which they explored the links between Jewish music and African American music.

Filmography

Film

Television

Stage

Awards and nominations 
Allison won the Canadian Screen Award for Best Supporting Actor in a Drama Series for his role as Pree in the television series Killjoys. He was also the recipient of two Tyrone Guthrie Awards presented by the Stratford Festival Company.

Over the course of his career, Allison was nominated for various Canadian Theatre Awards including three Dora awards, two Bettys, two Jessies, an Ovation, and a Sterling.

References

External links

20th-century Canadian male actors
21st-century Canadian male actors
Canadian male television actors
Canadian male stage actors
Canadian male musical theatre actors
Black Canadian male actors
21st-century Black Canadian male singers
Black Canadian LGBT people
Canadian gay actors
Gay singers
Male actors from Winnipeg
Musicians from Winnipeg
Living people
Canadian Mennonites
LGBT Mennonites
Year of birth missing (living people)
Best Supporting Actor in a Drama Series Canadian Screen Award winners
Canadian LGBT singers
20th-century Canadian LGBT people
21st-century Canadian LGBT people